The Screen Actors Guild - American Federation of Television and Radio Artists (SAG-AFTRA, stylized as SAG·AFTRA ) is an American labor union representing approximately 160,000 film and television actors, journalists, radio personalities, recording artists, singers, voice actors, internet influencers, fashion models, and other media professionals worldwide. The organization was formed on March 30, 2012, following the merger of the Screen Actors Guild (SAG, created in 1933) and the American Federation of Television and Radio Artists (AFTRA, created in 1937 as the American Federation of Radio Artists, gaining a 'T' in 1952 after its merger with the Television Authority). SAG-AFTRA is a member of the AFL–CIO, the largest federation of unions in the United States.

History

As of January 2013, Variety reported that the merger had proceeded with "few bumps", amid shows of good will on both sides. The stickiest remaining problem was reported to be the merger of the two pension funds, in part as a way of dealing with the issue of performers who paid into each plan, yet did not quite earn enough under either of the old plans to qualify for a pension.

Ken Howard was the first president of the merged union. Upon his death he was succeeded by Gabrielle Carteris in 2016. On September 2, 2021, Fran Drescher of the Unite for Strength faction was elected president.

SAG-AFTRA is headquartered in Los Angeles, California and in New York City in addition to other local offices nationwide.

Composition
SAG-AFTRA has a diverse membership consisting of actors, announcers, broadcast journalists, dancers, disc jockeys, news writers, news editors, program hosts, puppeteers, recording artists, singers, stunt performers, voiceover artists, and other media professionals.

Membership in SAG-AFTRA is considered a rite of passage for new performers and media professionals. It is often procured after getting hired for their first job in a studio that has a collective bargaining agreement with the union. SAG-AFTRA work is considered to be substantially more prestigious than non-union jobs. Due to the size and influence of the union, most major media firms have a collective bargaining agreement with SAG-AFTRA through the Association of Motion Picture and Television Producers. Studios that have signed a collective bargaining agreement with SAG-AFTRA are not closed shops, but are generally required to give preference to union members first when hiring.

Nearly all professional actors and media professionals working for medium or large-scale American media firms are expected to be unionized. As a result, SAG-AFTRA has many members who are consistently out of work, uncommon for a union, but reflective of how work is procured in the industry. According to SAG-AFTRA's Department of Labor records since its founding, around 34%, or a third, of the union's total membership have consistently been considered "withdrawn," "suspended," or otherwise not categorized as "active" members. These members are ineligible to vote in the union. "Honorable withdrawals" constitute the largest portion of these, at 20% of the total membership, or 46,934 members. "Suspended payment" members are the second largest, at 14%, or 33,422 members. This classification scheme is continued from the Screen Actors Guild, rather than the scheme used by AFTRA.

Factions 
The union is perceived as having two factions. The larger faction ("United for Strength") says it is focused on creating job opportunities for members. A second faction ("Membership First") has criticized the current administration for being too quick and soft when it comes to negotiations with studios.

Membership First

Unite for Strength 

"Global Rule One" is the foundation for SAG-AFTRA's unity as a union.  It essentially states that members may not perform in any form of media that is not protected under a SAG-AFTRA contract or affiliated unions' jurisdictions.

Major strikes and boycotts

Global Rule One 

Global Rule One states: No member shall render any services or make an agreement to perform services for any employer who has not executed a basic minimum agreement with the union, which is in full force and effect, in any jurisdiction in which there is a SAG-AFTRA national collective bargaining agreement in place. This provision applies worldwide.

Simply put, a SAG-AFTRA member must always work under a union contract around the globe.

Do not work orders are formally issued to denote productions that have not entered into the required agreements.

2016–17 strike 

After about a year and a half of negotiations, SAG-AFTRA issued a strike on October 21, 2016, against eleven American video game developers and publishers, including Activision, Electronic Arts, Insomniac Games, Take 2 Interactive, and WB Games. The strike resulted from attempted negotiations since February 2015 to replace the previous contract, the Interactive Media Agreement, that expired in late 2014. There were four major issues they fought for with this strike: establishing transparency in contract negotiation; preventing vocal stress from long recording sessions; providing safety assurances for stunt coordinators on performance capture sets; and giving payments of residuals based on sales of a video game, which have traditionally not been used in the video game industry. SAG-AFTRA members sought to bring equity for video game actors as in other industries, while the video game companies feared that giving residuals to actors would overshadow the contributions of programmers and artists that contribute to the games. It was the first such organized strike within the video game industry and the first voice actors' strike in 17 years, as well as the first strike within the merged SAG-AFTRA organization. As of April 23, 2017, it became the longest strike within SAG, surpassing the 95-day 1980 Emmy Awards strike, and the 2000 commercials strike.

An agreement was reached on September 23, 2017, ending the 340-day strike.

Bartle Bogle Hegarty Strike of 2018, Strike BBH 

On September 20, 2018, SAG-AFTRA called a strike against global advertising agency Bartle Bogle Hegarty (BBH) after BBH announced they would no longer honor a long-standing contract with SAG-AFTRA. SAG-AFTRA launched a successful strike action that drew thousands of members to picket lines and strike actions across the country. At the close of the strike, BBH agreed to return to SAG-AFTRA's contract.

In 2018, BBH had withdrawn from their contract with SAG-AFTRA, which was first agreed on in 1999, over contractual terms that stated BBH would not be allowed to hire non-union actors. BBH stated put them at competitive disadvantage as many of their peer agencies were not signatories.

SAG-AFTRA members' successful strike actions, including pickets and rallies throughout the U.S., proved a success for SAG-AFTRA. Several actions of note included a rally of 1,000 SAG-AFTRA members and supporters near SAG-AFTRA Headquarters at the La Brea Tar Pits, and a picket line at BBH Headquarters in Los Angeles that drew an estimated 1,000 members standing in solidarity on the picket line.

On July 20, 2019, SAG ended its 10-month strike against BBH after the advertising agency agreed to sign the union’s new commercials contract.

Donald Trump ban 

On February 7, 2021, SAG-AFTRA announced that former U.S. President Donald Trump, who resigned from the group on February 4, 2021, would be barred from ever rejoining due to his attacks on journalists and obstructing the peaceful transfer of power to the next president.

Organizing campaigns

Telemundo 
On February 9, 2016, NBCUniversal, Telemundo's parent company, faced claims by SAG-AFTRA of operating under a double standard between its Spanish-language and English-language talent at NBC and Telemundo. In its response, the network released a statement claiming it is “committed to making Telemundo a great place to work for our employees and will continue to invest in them to ensure their salaries and working conditions are competitive with the rest of the broadcasting industry in accordance with market size and station revenues.”

A few days later on February 13, 2016, SAG-AFTRA came back and added that Telemundo had been treating its employees like “second-class professionals” given that many actors do not receive basic workplace guarantees that SAG-AFTRA contracts provide, such as fair pay, water breaks, health insurance and residuals. At that time, Telemundo president Luis Silberwasser responded by saying that SAG-AFTRA asked for recognition of the union as the bargaining agent for employees — rather than seeking a vote by employees. However, SAG-AFTRA claimed that intimidation tactics had been taking place within the network to keep employees from unionizing and that they believe “there is no such thing as a ‘fair vote’ when workers are afraid for their careers and livelihoods, and live with the fear of retaliation if they are seen as actively wanting to unionize. SAG-AFTRA wants to ensure full protection for workplace democracy and performers’ rights to choose through a truly fair process.”

In August 2016, Telemundo once again found itself up against the union when the network refused to air an ad placed by SAG-AFTRA detailing the unfair wage gap and lack of benefits Telemundo employees face as opposed to unionized performers at NBCUniversal. The ad was set to air during the network’s premiere people’s choice awards Premios Tu Mundo but was never placed into rotation. A Telemundo spokesperson responded saying, “After legal review, we have concluded the ad did not pass legal standards for issue-based advertisement.” Meanwhile, other Spanish-language networks such as MegaTV and Estrella TV aired the ad nationwide.

SAG-AFTRA continued to stand its ground, stating that "Telemundo's decision to censor 30 seconds of truthful commentary about its working conditions shows just how averse it is to having a transparent discussion about its refusal to fairly compensate Spanish-speaking performers."

In March 2016, the National Labor Relations Board (NLRB) administered a secret vote amongst 124 Telemundo performers, based on the amount of time actors have worked on telenovela dramas and other shows. SAG-AFTRA announced that 81% of eligible voters chose to unionize in a balloting process that began Feb. 7 and lasted four weeks.

On July 12, 2018, SAG-AFTRA announced it had reached a first-ever tentative agreement with Telemundo Television Studios covering Spanish-language television performers, after fifteen months of negotiations.

Among the key elements of the three-year deal were:

 Contributions to and participation in the SAG-AFTRA Health Plan and SAG-Producers Pension Plan for the first time
 Residuals for both foreign and domestic exploitation and streaming platforms, based on a percentage of Telemundo’s gross receipts
 First ever guaranteed minimum rates for all covered performer categories (including actors, stunt performers, singers and dancers).
 Annual increases in all newly-established minimums between 1-2% per year
 Newly established working conditions and safety protections, including:
 Minimum rest period between calls of 10 hours
 Requirement for qualified personnel to coordinate stunts
 Provisions regarding protection of minors
 Overtime, holiday pay, and per diem when on location

The agreement was renewed in 2021, including an increase in overnight rest periods from 10 to 11 hours except for on-location work, additional language tackling sexual harassment and audition safety and an increase in the current health and pension plan contribution rate by 0.5 percent once the contract’s ended.

See also
 Alliance of Canadian Cinema, Television and Radio Artists (ACTRA)
 ANDA – similar Mexican organization
 Union des artistes – ACTRA's francophone equivalent

References

Further reading

External links 

 
2012 establishments in California
AFL–CIO
Labor relations in California
Screen Actors Guild
Trade unions established in 2012